The 1967 Houston Astros season was a season in American baseball. It involved the 69–93 Astros ninth-place finish in the National League, 32½ games behind the NL and World Series Champion St. Louis Cardinals.

Offseason 
 October 19, 1966: Bob Lillis was released by the Astros.
 November 28, 1966: Bo Belinsky was drafted by the Astros from the Philadelphia Phillies in the 1966 rule 5 draft.
 December 31, 1966: Dave Nicholson and Bob Bruce were traded by the Astros to the Atlanta Braves for Eddie Mathews, Arnold Umbach and a player to be named later. The Braves completed the deal by sending Sandy Alomar Sr. to the Astros on February 25, 1967.
 January 4, 1967: Lee Maye and Ken Retzer were traded by the Astros to the Cleveland Indians for Jim Landis, Jim Weaver, and Doc Edwards.
 March 24, 1967: Sandy Alomar was traded by the Astros to the New York Mets for Derrell Griffith.

Regular season

Season standings

Record vs. opponents

Opening Day starters 
Bob Aspromonte
John Bateman
Mike Cuellar
Sonny Jackson
Eddie Mathews
Joe Morgan
Aaron Pointer
Rusty Staub
Jimmy Wynn

Notable transactions 
 April 28, 1967: Bob Lillis was signed as a free agent by the Astros.
 June 6, 1967: John Mayberry was drafted by the Astros in the 1st round (6th pick) of the 1967 Major League Baseball draft.
 June 15, 1967: Claude Raymond was traded by the Astros to the Atlanta Braves for Wade Blasingame.
 July 20, 1967: Gary Kroll was purchased from the Astros by the Cleveland Indians.
 August 7, 1967: Jim Weaver was traded by the Astros to the California Angels for a player to be named later. The Angels completed the deal by sending Héctor Torres to the Astros on November 21.

Roster

Player stats

Batting

Starters by position 
Note: Pos = Position; G = Games played; AB = At bats; H = Hits; Avg. = Batting average; HR = Home runs; RBI = Runs batted in

Other batters 
Note: G = Games played; AB = At bats; H = Hits; Avg. = Batting average; HR = Home runs; RBI = Runs batted in

Pitching

Starting pitchers 
Note: G = Games pitched; IP = Innings pitched; W = Wins; L = Losses; ERA = Earned run average; SO = Strikeouts

Other pitchers 
Note: G = Games pitched; IP = Innings pitched; W = Wins; L = Losses; ERA = Earned run average; SO = Strikeouts

Relief pitchers 
Note: G = Games pitched; W = Wins; L = Losses; SV = Saves; ERA = Earned run average; SO = Strikeouts

Farm system

References

External links
1967 Houston Astros season at Baseball Reference

Houston Astros seasons
Houston Astros season
Houston Astros